Hikayat (Jawi: حكاية) - an Arabic word that literally translates to "stories" - is a form of Malay literature which relate the adventures of heroes from kingdoms across the Malay archipelago (spanning modern Indonesia and Malaysia, especially in Sumatra) or chronicles of their royalty. The stories they contain, though based on history, are heavily romanticized. Poetical format is not required in Malay and Arabic Hikayat while the Acehnese Hikayat requires it. This is a list of hikayat.

14th century
 Hikayat Bayan Budiman Bayan 1371   (MS 1852) 
 Hikayat Raja-raja Pasai Pasai ±1390   (MS 1815)

15th century
 Hikayat Muhammad Hanafiah   MH ±1450   (MSS <1624, <1682) 
 Hikayat Amir Hamzah

16th century
 Hikayet Deva Mandu
 Hikayat Seri Rama    Rama unknown   (MS <1633) (A Ramayana translation into Malay)
 Hikayat Inderaputera    Ind <1600   (MS 1600) (Hikayat Indraputra)
 Hikayat Iskandar Zulkarnain    Isk <1600   (MS ±1830) 
 Qasidah al-Burdah    QB unknown   (MS <1604) 
 `Aqâ´id al-Nasafî    AN 1590   (MS ditto) 
 Syair Hamzah Fansuri    HF late 16th century   (MSS early 17th century - 1853)

17th century
 Spraek en Woord-Boek    SWB 1603 
 Taj al-Salatin (Dewan)    TS.D 1603   (MS ±1775) 
 Taj al-Salatin (Roorda)    TS.R 1603 
 Hikayat Aceh    Aceh ±1625   (MS ±1675) 
 Cerita Kutai    Kutai 1625   (MS 1849) 
 Bustan al-Salatin    BS 1640   (MS >1807) 
 Hujjat al-Siddîq    HS 1641-1644   (MS 1772) 
 Hikayat Tanah Hitu    Hitu 1650   (MS <1662) 
 Hikayat Ibrahim ibn Adham    IbrA ±1650   (MS 1775) 
 Hikayat Pelanduk Jenaka    Pel unknown   (MS ±1650) 
 Sejarah Melayu SM ±1650   (MS 1808) 
 Hikayat Banjar dan Kota Waringin    Banj 1663   (MS 1810) 
 Tarjumân al-Mustafîd    TM 1642-1693   (MS ±1675) 
 Bab Takzir    BT ±1680   (MS <1753) 
 Hikayat Ibrahim ibn Adham (short)    IbrA.s 1689   (MS 1817)
 Raja Babi (1775)

18th century
 Asal Bangsa Jin & Dewa-Dewa    ABJD ±1700   (MS 1855) 
 Hikayat Hang Tuah    Tuah 1700   (MS 1849) 
 Hikayat Patani    Pat 1730   (MS 1839) 
 Surat al-Anbiya'    Anb ±1750 
 Syair Bidasari    Bid ±1750   (MS 1825) 
 Risalah Shihabuddin    RS 1750s   (MS 1823) 
 Risalah fi 'l-Tawhid    RT 1760s   (MS 1783) 
 Misa Melayu    Misa ±1780   (MS 1836) 
 Hikayat Nakhoda Muda    Nakh 1788   (MS <1791)
 Hikaaitaan - Hikayats by Guru Gobind Singh (1704)

19th century
 Hikayat Perintah Negeri Benggala    PNB 1811   (MS 1811) 
 Syair Sultan Maulana    Maul ±1815   (MS 1825) 
 Syair Sinyor Kosta    Kosta 1820 
 Syair Raja Tedung dengan Raja Katak    T&K unknown   (MS ±1865) 
 Hikayat Merong Mahawangsa    MW ±1821   (MS 1898) 
 Surat Keterangan Syeikh Jalaluddin    SJal >1821   (MS <1829) 
 Silsilah Perak    Perak ±1826 
 Syair Kerajaan Bima    Bima ±1830   (MS 1857) 
 Syair Dagang Berjual-Beli    DBB 1831 
 Syair Potong Gaji    PG 1831 
 Syair Tengku Perbu    Perb 1835 
 Hikayat Panca Tanderan 1835
 Kisah Pelayaran Abdullah ke Kelantan 1838 
 Civil War in Kelantan    Kel 1839 
 Hikayat Marakarma (Si Miskin)    Misk unknown   (MS 1855) 
 Ceretera2 karangan Abdullah    Abd.C 1843,1851 
 Hikayat Abdullah 1843 
 Syair2 karangan Abdullah    Abd.S 1828-1848 
 Syair Engku Puteri    EPut 1844 
 Hikayat Maharaja Marakarma    Mar 1844 or 1848 
 Syair Perang Johor    PJ 1844 
 Hikayat Iblis    Iblis 1846 
 Syair Kunjungan Tengku Selangor    KTS <1860 
 Warnasarie    Ws 1852 
 Kisah Pelayaran Abdullah ke Mekah 1854 
 Mukhtasar Tawarikh al-Wustha    TW 1854 
 Hikayat Siak    Siak 1855   (MS 1893) 
 Syair Kumbang Mengindera    Kumb <1859 
 Surat kepada Von de Wall    VdW 1856-1872 
 Syair Bayan Budiman    BayB ±1860 
 Syair Kumbang dan Melati    K&M <1866 
 Syair Bunga Air Mawar    Mwr <1866 
 Syair Nuri dengan Simbangan    Nuri ±1860 
 Syair Nyamuk dan Lalat    Nymk ±1860 
 Syair Saudagar Bodoh    SBod 1861 
 Hikayat Raja Damsyik    Dmsy.H 1863 
 Syair Raja Damsyik    Dmsy.S 1864 
 Syair Kiamat    Kmt unknown   (MS 1865) 
 Salasilah Melayu dan Bugis    M&B 1865 
 Tuhfat al-Nafis    TN 1866   (MS 1890) 
 Syair Awai    Awai 1868 
 Syair Bunga-Bungaan    Bunga ±1870 
 Syair Burung Pungguk    Pung ±1870 
 Syair Unggas Soal Jawab    Ungg 1871 
 Syair Sang Kupu-Kupu    Kupu ? 1870s 
 Kitab Suci    KS 1879 (PL), 1935 (PB) 
 Raja Inggeris Jubili    RIJ 1887 
 Ucapan Kwin Jubili    UKJ 1887 (edition 1891) PB 1889-1938 
 Muhimmat al-Nafa´is    MN 1892 
 Syair Perjalanan Sultan Lingga    PSL 1894 
 Al-Imam    Imam 1906-1908 
 Syair Raksi    Raksi unknown   (MS 1915) 
 Majalah Guru    MG 1930-1935 
 Saudara    S 1930-1935 
 Warta Malaya    WM 1931-1935 
 Majlis    M 1932-1935

Miscellaneous 
Hikayat Mara Karma
Hikayat Gul Bakawali
Hikayat Perang Sabil (Hikayat Prang Sabi)
Hikayat Raja Baday
Hikayat Éseutamu

The original Jawi script Acehnese language work Hikayat Perang Sabil (Hikayat Prang Sabi) has been transliterated into the Latin alphabet and annotated by Ibrahim Alfian (Teuku.) published in Jakarta. Perang sabi was the Acehnese word for jihad, a holy war and Acehnese language literary works on perang sabi were distributed by Islamic clerics ('ulama) such as Teungku di Tiro to help the resistance against the Dutch in the Aceh War. The recompense awarded by in paradise detailed in Islamic Arabic texts and Dutch atrocities were expounded on in the Hikayat Perang Sabil which was communally read by small cabals of Ulama and Acehnese who swore an oath before going to achieve the desired status of "martyr" by launching suicide attacks on the Dutch. Perang sabil was the Malay equivalent to other terms like Jihad, Ghazawat for "Holy war", the text was also spelled "Hikayat perang sabi". Fiction novels like Sayf Muhammad Isa's Sabil: Prahara di Bumi Rencong on the war by Aceh against the Dutch include references ro Hikayat Perang Sabil. 	Mualimbunsu Syam Muhammad wrote the work called "Motives for Perang Sabil in Nusantara", Motivasi perang sabil di Nusantara: kajian kitab Ramalan Joyoboyo, Dalailul-Khairat, dan Hikayat Perang Sabil on Indonesia's history of Islamic holy war (Jihad). Children and women were inspired to do suicide attacks by the Hikayat Perang Sabil against the Dutch. Hikayat Perang Sabil is also known as "Hikayat Prang Sabi". Hikayat Perang Sabil is considered as part of 19th century Malay literature. In Dutch occupied Aceh, Hikayat Perang Sabil was confiscated from Sabi's house during a Police raid on September 27, 1917.

Notes

External links
 http://mcp.anu.edu.au/Q/texts.html

 https://www.hasibhai.com/2020/06/blog-post_18.html

Precolonial states of Indonesia
Hikayat
Malay-language literature
Hikayat